Fulakora saundersi is a species of ant in the genus Fulakora, endemic to New Zealand.

References

External links

Amblyoponinae
Ants of New Zealand
Insects described in 1892
Endemic fauna of New Zealand

Hymenoptera of New Zealand
Endemic insects of New Zealand